The 2021 Clásica de San Sebastián was a road cycling one-day race that took place on 31 July 2021 in San Sebastián, Spain. It was the 40th edition of the Clásica de San Sebastián and the twenty-second event of the 2021 UCI World Tour. It was won by Neilson Powless in a three way sprint.

Result

References

External links 
 

2021
2021 UCI World Tour
2021 in Spanish road cycling
July 2021 sports events in Spain